Bandicota is a genus of rodents from Asia known as the bandicoot rats. Their common name and genus name are derived from the Telugu language word pandikokku (పందికొక్కు). DNA studies have found the group to be a monophyletic clade sister to the radiation of Molucca and Australian Rattus species as part of the paraphyletic Rattus sensu lato.

Species 

Greater bandicoot rat (B. indica) Bechstein, 1800
Lesser bandicoot rat (B. bengalensis) Gray and Hardwicke, 1833
Savile's bandicoot rat (B. savilei) Thomas, 1916

References 

 
Rodent genera
Taxa named by John Edward Gray